eIF2B is a protein complex found in eukaryotes. It is the guanine nucleotide exchange factor for the eukaryotic initiation factor 2 and therefore converts the inactive eIF2-GDP to the active eIF2-GTP. This activation is hindered by phosphorylation of the alpha subunit of eIF2, which leads to a stable eIF2α-P-GDP-eIF2B complex and therefore inhibits translation initiation.

Human genes which encode eIF-2B proteins include:
 EIF2B1 – alpha subunit (26kDa)
 EIF2B2 – beta subunit (39kDa)
 EIF2B3 – gamma subunit (58kDa)
 EIF2B4 – delta subunit (67kDa)
 EIF2B5 – epsilon subunit (82kDa)

References

Protein biosynthesis
Gene expression
Proteins